3199 Nefertiti, provisional designation , is a rare-type asteroid, classified as near-Earth object of the Amor group of asteroids, approximately 2.2 kilometers in diameter. It was discovered on 13 September 1982, by American astronomer couple Carolyn and Eugene Shoemaker at Palomar Observatory, California, United States.

Orbit and classification 

Nefertiti orbits the Sun at a distance of 1.1–2.0 AU once every 1 years and 12 months (722 days). Its orbit has an eccentricity of 0.28 and an inclination of 33° with respect to the ecliptic.

As no precoveries were taken, and no prior identifications were made, the body's observation arc begins with its official discovery observation at Palomar in 1982.

Physical characteristics

Spectral type 

In the Tholen and SMASS taxonomy, Nefertiti is a stony S-type and transitional Sq-type, respectively. In addition, its spectral type is also that of a bright and rare K and Q type, according to Spitzer and PanSTARRS. The Collaborative Asteroid Lightcurve Link derives an albedo of 0.326 and a diameter of 2.18 kilometers with an absolute magnitude of 15.14.

Rotation period 

Several rotational lightcurves of Nefertiti have been obtained from photometric observations. In descending order of quality, rotation periods were derived by Czech astronomer Petr Pravec in the 1990s (3.021 hours; Δ0.30 mag), at the Italian Padova and Catania observatories in February 2003 (3.021 hours; Δ0.19 mag), by Polish astronomer Wiesław Z. Wiśniewski in the 1980s (2.82 hours; Δ0.12 mag), by Finnish physicist Mikko Kaasalainen (3.020167 hours; Δmag n.a.), and by Harris at JPL/Caltech in the 1980s (3.01 hours; Δ0.1 mag).

Naming 

This minor planet was named for the ancient Egyptian queen Nefertiti (ca. 1370–1330 BC), mother-in-law of pharaoh Tutankhamun and Chief King's Wife of Akhenaten of the 18th dynasty. Nefertiti and her "heretic" husband are believed to be responsible for a religious revolution, creating a new monotheistic religion, in which they only worshiped the sun disc god Aten. Another minor planet, 1068 Nofretete is also named for her, using a different spelling. The official naming citation was published by the Minor Planet Center on 27 December 1985.

References

External links 
 Asteroid Lightcurve Database (LCDB), query form (info )
 Dictionary of Minor Planet Names, Google books
 Asteroids and comets rotation curves, CdR – Observatoire de Genève, Raoul Behrend
 
 
 

003199
Discoveries by Eugene Merle Shoemaker
Discoveries by Carolyn S. Shoemaker
Named minor planets
3199 Nefertiti
003199
003199
19820913